Kumar Shri Duleepsinhji (13 June 1905 – 5 December 1959) was a cricketer who played for England. Playing in the era before the Indian cricket team, he is considered one of India's first great batsmen, alongside his uncle Ranjitsinhji, who also represented England. Born in present-day Gujarat, he was educated at the Rajkumar College, Rajkot, before moving to England as a boy, where he attended Cheltenham College, and Cambridge University. The Duleep Trophy, long one of the premier competitions in Indian first class cricket, is named after him.

Cricket career 

Descended from the Jam Sahibs of Nawanagar State, Duleepsinhji was born on the Kathiawar peninsula in present-day Gujarat. His brothers included Himmatsinhji, the first Lieutenant-Governor of Himachal Pradesh, and Digvijaysinhji, who succeeded the brothers' uncle, Ranjitsinhji, as ruler of Nawanagar. Ranjitsinhji, after whom the Ranji Trophy is named, also played cricket for England.
While he was still playing school cricket, the future President of the MCC, HS Altham, wrote of him in Wisden: "In natural gifts of eye, wrist and footwork he is certainly blest far above the ordinary measure... there is no doubt about the judgment and certainty with which he takes toll of straight balls of anything but the most immaculate length. His late cutting is quite beautiful and there is a certain ease and maturity about all his batting methods that stamps him as of a different class from the ordinary school batsman." Duleepsinhji went on to achieve great success as a batsman for Cheltenham College, Cambridge University, Sussex and eventually England in a career cut short by recurrent illness. His Test average of 58.5 ranks him among the best batsmen to have played Test cricket. In 1930, playing for Sussex, he scored 333 runs in one day against Northamptonshire.

Public service

Following his playing career, and based on his experience as High Commissioner of India in Australia and New Zealand, Duleepsinhji was made Chairman of the Public Service Commission in the State of Saurashtra after his return to India.

Duleepsinhji also visited the first and the only public utility thermal power station in the State, at that time located at Shapur Sorath, near a village called Vanthly (near Junagadh). As this power station was using crushed coal as fuel for boilers and chlorination for the cooling water system, which normally polluted the local atmosphere; he wanted to see personally the working conditions and the amenities provided for the villagers housing and the recreation facilities.

Death

Duleepsinhji died on 5 December 1959, following a heart attack, in Bombay. The Duleep Trophy is named in his honour.

References

External links

 Kumar Shri Duleepsinhji: Cricketer of the Year 1930: By Wisden Almanack archive

England Test cricketers
Indian cricketers
Sussex cricketers
Sussex cricket captains
Cambridge University cricketers
Gentlemen cricketers
Marylebone Cricket Club cricketers
Hindus cricketers
North v South cricketers
Wisden Cricketers of the Year
1905 births
1959 deaths
People educated at Cheltenham College
Alumni of Clare College, Cambridge
Cricketers from Gujarat
Indian royalty
Gujarati people
Maharajas of Nawanagar
Indian civil servants
High Commissioners of India to Australia
High Commissioners of India to New Zealand
British Asian cricketers
English cricketers of 1919 to 1945
H. D. G. Leveson Gower's XI cricketers
Lord Hawke's XI cricketers
C. I. Thornton's XI cricketers